Cleiton is a name. People with that name include:
Cleiton Abrão (born 1989), middle-distance runner
Cleiton (footballer, born 1978), born Cleiton Mendes dos Santos, Brazilian football midfielder
Cleiton (footballer, born 1979), born Cleiton Oliveira Pinto, Brazilian football midfielder
Cleiton (footballer, born April 1986), born José Cleiton Ferreira Júnior, Brazilian football striker
Cleiton (footballer, born December 1986), born Cleiton de Oliveira Velasques, Brazilian football midfielder
Cleiton (footballer, born 1992), born Cleiton Pedro Guimarães, Brazilian football left-back
Cleiton (footballer, born 1997), born Cleiton Schwengber, Brazilian football goalkeeper
Cleiton (footballer, born 2003), born Cleiton Santana dos Santos, Brazilian football defender
Cleiton Kanu (born 1985), born Cleiton Januário Franco, Brazilian football striker
Cleiton Silva (born 1987), born Cleiton Augusto Oliveira Silva, Brazilian football striker
Cleiton Xavier (born 1983), Brazilian football attacking midfielder

See also
Cleyton (disambiguation)